Breton Women at a Pardon (French: Les Bretonnes au Pardon) is an 1887 oil on canvas by the French academic painter Pascal Dagnan-Bouveret. It shows seven women sitting on grass in a churchyard waiting for a ceremony to begin. The painting is composed from somber tones and the women have a serene calmness and a demeanour described as the embodiedness of "simplicity and piety".

The women are dressed in traditional Breton costume which in the late 19th century would have been reserved for such an event; various starched white headdresses and collars, worn over long plain dark dresses. They are huddled in conversation while two men stand to their left with heads bowed, looking coyly at the women. The men have round black hats and are similarly dressed in black with while collars.

This work is the culmination of a series of Breton paintings and follows directly from the similar 1886 The Pardon in Brittany. It has a photorealistic look; Dagnan-Bouveret often used photographs as well as drawings and oil sketches when preparing for a finished canvas. There are many known photographic studies and drawings both for the Breton series in general, and this work in particular. One photograph shows a grassy area in which the artist had a friend pose, another a view of the church seen here in the background, complete with the festival flags protruding from the lower spire.

The vertical framing and almost uncomfortable proximity of the women add to its 'snapshot' aspect. From the photographs, the painting is known to have been posed at the Pardon de Rumengol, Finistère, Brittany.

Breton Women at a Pardon was first exhibited at the Salon in 1889, where it drew acclaim and won the Grand Prise. It is often compared to Paul Gauguin's at the time controversial 1888 Vision After the Sermon and Émile Bernard's 1888 Breton Women in the Meadow (clearly inspired by Dagnan-Bouveret), as much for contrast in approach and in critical reaction, as for their thematic and compositional similarities. Gauguin and Bernard were seen as radicals at the time, and disdained at the Salon.

Gallery

Notes

References
 Cachin, Francoise. Gauguin. Flammarion, 1990. 
 Daniélou, Serge. Email from the Pastoral Council of 
 Weisberg, Gabriel. Against the Modern: Dagnan-Bouveret and the Transformation of the Academic Tradition. Rutgers University Press, 2002. 
 Wold, Gretchen. "Some Notes on 'The Pardon in Brittany' by Dagnan-Bouveret". Metropolitan Museum Journal, volume 35, 2000

1887 paintings
French paintings
Academic art
Breton culture
Paintings in the collection of the Calouste Gulbenkian Museum